Roger Johnson (by 1530 – 1564 or later) was an English politician.

He was a Member (MP) of the Parliament of England for Grantham in November 1554.

References

Year of death missing
English MPs 1554–1555
Year of birth uncertain